José Luis Lobato may refer to:

 José Luis Lobato (politician) (1938-2014),  Mexican politician
 José Luis Lobato (volleyball) (born 1977, Spanish volleyball player